Mesoboa was a town of ancient Arcadia  on the Ladon. Its site is unlocated.

References

Populated places in ancient Arcadia
Former populated places in Greece
Lost ancient cities and towns